Egon Hansen (footballer)
 Egon Hansen (sport shooter)